Diakopto railway station is located just north of Diakopto, Achaea, Greece. Originally opened on 10 March 1896, it was reopened on 22 June 2020 as part of the Hellenic Railways Organisation's €848-million project extension of the Athens Airport–Patras railway to Aigio, co-financed by the European Union's Cohesion Fund 2000–2006.

History
The Station opened on 10 March 1896, on what was a branch line of the Piraeus, Athens & Peloponnese Railways (SPAP) when the  gauge line was completed in 1895. The line opened under the government of Theodoros Diligiannis however, work had been begun by the Charilaos Trikoupis government, under the grand project of connecting all of Greece by rail. The French company ATON with Italian craftsmen's assistant, who had acquired great experience in similar projects in the Alps, built the line. The construction of the network began in 1889 and was completed in 1895. Due to growing debts, the SPAP came under government control between 1939 and 1940.

During the Axis occupation of Greece (1941–44), Athens was controlled by German military forces and the line used for the transport of troops and weapons. During the occupation (and especially during the German withdrawal in 1944), the network was severely damaged by both the German army and Greek resistance groups. The track and rolling stock replacement took time following the civil war, with normal service levels resumed around 1948.

Between 2007 and 2009, the entire rail and cogwheel components of the Diakopto–Kalavryta railway were completely replaced, and four new modern trains were constructed to replace the older carriages. In 2008, the Athens Suburban Railway was transferred from OSE to TrainOSE. In 2009, with the Greek debt crisis unfolding OSE's Management was forced to reduce services across the network. Timetables were cutback and routes closed, as the government-run entity attempted to reduce overheads, this included all passenger and freight services on the metre gauge railway system in the Peloponnese in 2011.

However, Diakopto remained open, serving the rack railway. In 2018, work to incorporate the station into the Athens Airport–Patras railway commenced, requiring the conversion of the old metre-gauge track to standard gauge. In 2019 services were suspended due to a landslide. The station was reopened on 22 June 2020 by Minister for Transport, Kostas Karamanlis, re-establishing direct rail links with Athens via the Athens Suburban Railway. In July 2022, the station began being served by Hellenic Train, the rebranded TrainOSE.

Facilities
There is level access from the small car park at the front of the station. It has two island platforms, with station buildings located at the platform level. The Station buildings are equipped only with a waiting area. At platform level, there are sheltered seating and Dot-matrix display departure and arrival screens and timetable poster boards on both platforms. It is equipped with CCTV, fire detection and Honeywell Security systems. Currently, there is no local bus stop connecting the station.

Services

Since 15 May 2022, this station serves the following routes:

The station is also served by the following Hellenic Train route:

Station layout

Gallery

See also
Diakopto–Kalavryta railway
Hellenic Railways Organization
Hellenic Train
P.A.Th.E./P.
Piraeus, Athens and Peloponnese Railways
Proastiakos

References

Diakopto
Railway stations in Achaea
Railway stations opened in 1896
Railway stations opened in 2020